Fillos de Galicia is a web portal and virtual community that focuses on the Galician culture and diaspora. The site focuses on promoting unity between Galicians and the Galician diaspora. The community is a hub that provides information about the Galician language or finding relatives in Galicia using the Atopadoiro. Fillos.org is one of the most popular websites regarding Galicia and its diaspora.

History
Fillos de Galicia was started in 1997 by Manuel Casal Lodeiro, son of Galician emigrants. Since its inception, the portal has been growing. The supporting association spawned sister sites dealing with specific themes relating to Galicians.

Statistics
As of 2010, more than 6700 users had registered, from over 70 countries. MOst are between ages 30 and 60. Over 1500 live in Argentina, with sizable populations in Spain and Brazil. Over half are either born in Galicia or children of Galicians. Another 1200 are grandchildren and great-grandchildren of Galicians. Of all the users, 60 are paying members called socios in Spanish.

During 2012, the site experienced 339.499 visits. An average of 1.5 pages were visited each month by guests, coming from 29,000 visits per month.

References

Sources

External links
 
  (tagging-based social networking service)
  (social bookmarking)
  (categorization of traditional Galician names)
  (web portal for Galician organizations all around the world)
 Rede Galega (Internet services for Galician nonprofits)
 Planeta Galego (Galician diaspora webzine)
  (mini-site on Prestige ecological disaster)
  (Fund-raising & net.art project)

Galician culture
Web portals